Atsadang Road is a road in inner Bangkok (Rattanakosin Island) overlaps four Subdistricts of Phra Nakhon District, Bowon Niwet, San Chaopho Suea, Wat Ratchabophit, and Wang Burapha Phirom. It's starting from Ratchadamnoen Avenue in the area beside Sanam Luang and Phan Phiphop Lila Bridge pass through to the end at the junction of Chakkraphet Road and Charoen Rat 31 Bridge in the area of Pak Khlong Talat behind Ban Mo neighbourhood near the Chao Phraya River. There's Khlong Khu Mueang Doem (old city moat) or Khlong Lot (tube canal) parallel along the length. The opposite is Rachini Road.

Its name "Atsadang" in honour of Prince Asdang Dejavudh, who was a son of King Chulalongkorn (Rama V) and Queen Saovabha Phongsri, includes the younger brother of King Vajiravudh (Rama VI).

There're many places where this road passes. Most of them are historical sites such as Wat Buranasirimattayaram, Charoen Si 34 Bridge, Samphraeng neighbourhood, Chang Rong Si Bridge, Royal Cemetery at Wat Ratchabophit, Ministry of Interior, Pig Memorial and Pi Kun Bridge, Saphan Hok, Saphan Mon, Ban Mo Palace etc.

Moreover, shophouses on the road side between Ban Mo with Pak Khlong Talat areas. They're beautiful and historic buildings built with Sino-Portuguese architecture since reign of King Chulalongkorn and was registered as an ancient monument of Bangkok. 

And the beginning area of the road near Sanam Luang. It's well known in the name of "Lang Krasuang" (หลังกระทรวง; lit: behind the ministry, refers to Ministry of Defense) as centre of shops in government uniforms, musical instruments, audio and electronic equipments with hiking equipments.  

The Samsen and Atsadang Line of Bangkok's Trams used to run on this road until 1968.

References 

Streets in Bangkok
Phra Nakhon district